Vasif Ahsen-Böre (Tatar: Васыйф Әхсән Бүре; Wasıyf Äxsän Büre; 1 January 1924 – 2008) was a Finnish ice hockey player. He began his career with TBK Tampere in 1942, and remained with the team until 1945. His brothers Feyzi, Murat, and Zeyd were also hockey players. Their father was the Tatar businessman Zinnetullah Ahsen Böre.

Career statistics

References

1924 births
2008 deaths
Finnish ice hockey players
Tappara players
Ice hockey people from Tampere
20th-century Finnish people
Finnish people of Tatar descent